Vanderbilt Commodores football All-Southerns are American football players who have been named as All-Southerns while playing for the Vanderbilt University football team.

Overview

Since 1902, 63 Vanderbilt Commodores football players earned first-team All-Southern honors.

Sortable chart of Vanderbilt's All-Southerns
Bold = unanimous selection.

References

Tennessee sports-related lists